The Garden City Broncbusters are the sports teams of Garden City Community College located in Garden City, Kansas, United States. They participate in the NJCAA, primarily competing in the Kansas Jayhawk Community College Conference.

Sports

Men's sports
Baseball
Basketball
Cross country
Football
Golf
Rodeo
Track & field

Women's sports
Basketball
Cross country
Rodeo
Soccer
Softball
Track & field
Volleyball

Facilities
Garden City Community College has five facilities.
 Broncbuster Baseball Academy – indoor baseball and softball practice facility
 Dennis Perryman Stadium – home of the Broncbusters men's and women's basketball teams, and volleyball team
Broncbuster Stadium – home  of the Broncbusters football, soccer and track & field teams
 Tangeman Sports Complex – home  of the Broncbusters softball team
 Williams Stadium – home of the Broncbusters baseball team

Notable alumni
 Amir Abdur-Rahim, Head Coach, Kennesaw State Owls men's basketball
 Corey Dillon, former NFL player for the New England Patriots and Cincinnati Bengals; won Super Bowl XXXIX; four-time Pro Bowl selection
 Mark Fox, University of California men's basketball head coach
 Benjamin Gay, former NFL player for the Cleveland Browns
 Darrin Hancock, former NBA player; named to the National Junior College Athletic Association All-American team; National Player of the Year; later starred in the 1993 Final Four with the University of Kansas
 Kay-Jay Harris, former NFL player for the New York Giants, St. Louis Rams, and Miami Dolphins
 Tyreek Hill, football player for the Miami Dolphins.
 Corey Jenkins, former NFL player for the Miami Dolphins and Chicago Bears
 C.J. Jones, current free agent, former NFL player for several teams
 Korey Jones, CFL player for the BC Lions
 Phil Loadholt, NFL player for the Minnesota Vikings
 Frank Murphy, former NFL and UFL player; was named to the National Junior College Athletic Association All-American first-team; National Player of the Year
 Darvis Patton, "Doc"; retired sprinter in track and field; three-time Olympian (two silver medals); four-time participant at the World Championships (multiple medals, including two golds)
 Derrick Pope, current free agent; former NFL and CFL player for several teams
 Tyson Thompson, former NFL player for the Dallas Cowboys

References

External links
 

Sports teams in Kansas